OH Cards are a genre of special playing cards used as story–telling prompters, counseling and psychotherapeutic tools, communication enhancers, educational aids, and social interactive games. OH cards have no official or traditional interpretations of images, and instructions included with the decks encourage imaginative and personal interpretations of the images. Usually these images are small paintings created by various artists specifically for this kind of use. As a genre, OH cards are unconventional "information containers", unbound books with no set sequence of pages.

Their most common uses are as a focus for self–examination and as prompters in social interactions. They are often used as aides in psychotherapeutic settings, and in a variety of educational situations. Less commonly, OH cards are used as catalysts in artistic fields: in writing, painting, theatre, even dance.

Categorically OH Cards operate in the interface of literature, art appreciation, games and psychology. Most commonly they are used as a focus for self–examination. In some parts of the world they are called kesem cards or Cards of Association.

The OH Cards 
The genre originated with the publication in 1982 of a set of two interrelated cards decks called The OH Cards, invented by Canadian artist Ely Raman, and first published in 1982, that consist of
"…88 picture cards, supplemented by 88 word cards. To play, a picture card is placed inside a larger word card. The word, such as ‘game’, ‘love’, ‘grief’ or ‘letting go’ forms the framework for interpreting the picture. A total of 7744 combinations are possible."

In the first version, the words were in English, but within a few years they were translated into German, Dutch, and French. At this time (2006) The OH Cards, published in Germany by OH Verlag, are available in 18 languages including Chinese, Croatian, Danish, Finnish, Hebrew, Italian, Japanese, Norwegian, Polish, Portuguese, Greek, Russian, Swedish, Spanish, Turkish, and Romanian and are being used all over the world.

Most of these decks can be used for play, especially play that involves imagination and expression. The cards are not arranged in suits, nor are they numbered (except for a tiny identification number beside the copyright line), so they do not lend themselves to games that are hierarchical or competitive, with winners and losers and scores. This aspect is underlined by the OH Etiquette (see below); a set of "rules" that deal more with behaviour, attitude, and communication skills than with legalistic boundaries.

Development of the OH card genre 
The OH genre grew slowly over the years, starting with the publication, in 1989, of Saga, a 55–card deck of paintings by Ely Raman illustrating scenes in possible fairy tales. Two years later American artist David Ellis produced a deck of 99 cards with abstract paintings called ecco. The Canadian naturalist and artist [Christian Gronau] focused on our interaction with the natural environment with a deck of 88 cards called Habitat (1993). Ely Raman explored a different use of two–deck interactivity with a pair of decks called Persona (1994), one of portraits; the other of abstract designs that can symbolize possible social interactions or personal relationships.

For some reason, photographic images do not seem to stimulate imaginative responses. Orca, (1997), a deck about the environment inhabited by killer whales did not generate enough response to warrant a second printing despite the photos from Alexandra Morton’s collection; neither did Raccoon, (1996) a photo essay of a family of raccoons and their neighbours.

Hand–painted images fared better. Morená, (1996) a 2–deck pictorial record of the tribal life of the rain forest people painted lovingly by Brazilian artist Walde Mar de Andrade e Silva continues to charm and mystify users. A collection of Scheherazade–inspired paintings became a deck called 1001, (2003); they were painted by Canadian artist Andreé Pouliot Raman produced two more decks, a sister deck to Saga, called Mythos (2000) with a classical mythological theme, and –– in collaboration with Russian artist Marina Lukyanova –– a sister deck to Persona, called Personita, (2005), with portraits of children and ink sketches of stick–like figures in action. Lukyanova also painted the 88 picture cards for Cope (2002) a specialized deck addressing the trauma of children in war–torn areas, and used by therapists according to a detailed protocol. The deck was conceived by Ofra Ayalon, a renowned Israeli psychotherapist and Moritz Egetmeyer, the publisher of most of the decks in the genre.
 
Egetmeyer’s contribution to the genre is his ability to recognize the uniqueness of the thematically and artistically different decks and finding ways of marketing them successfully. Realizing that individuals would like to create their own decks, in 1998 he published Claro, a deck of cards with one surface blank and unvarnished, suitable for drawing or painting. Thus the genre is extended with unique, truly personal decks. For people who love cooking and amuse themselves by inventing unusual dishes and menus, Cuisine (1999) provides a deck with 110 illustrations of foodstuffs.

Limited Editions 
Not all decks in the genre have a wide market. OH cards are, in a sense, a specialized art form, described at one time by Raman as "unbound books." In this spirit, OH Verlag published four limited edition decks for collectors: Beauregard, by American artist Joan Beauregard; a deck of delicate and absorbing abstract collages; Lydia Jacob Story, collage–drawings by the French artist Raymond E. Waydelich. In a different vein, Bosch, which consists of 65 cards of details from Heironimus Bosch’s masterpiece, the Garden of Earthly Delights that can be assembled, jig–saw style, to see a reproduction of the famous triptych as a whole. For a special, personal take on art, there is an anthology of 55 details from some of Paul Gauguin’s best–loved paintings that Egetmeyer assembled under the title of Tahiti. Each of these decks explores the possibilities of presenting ideas in an unbound book –– a deck of cards.

The process of drawing pictorial images at random and then using these images in some way to invent a menu or a story, or trigger intuitive insights into psychological and social situations is unnerving for some people. There is an anarchic undertone to such activity that upsets people who are used to information presented sequentially, as in books. But the process also provides fun, stimulus for the exercise of imagination, and an opportunity for communal interaction. Since most of the decks are printed on poker–sized cards, cards from different decks can combined. Typically, a picture from a deck such as Persona is placed on an OH word card, or the abstractions in Persona are used to draw a number of 1001 cards to develop a complex story. This makes the genre more elastic, but also potentially confusing.

Similar decks 
Using the same structural idea as The OH Cards, and with a more recent history, Shadow Cards provide an electronic demonstration on how the combination of word and picture works, but with a different process and simpler imagery (crayons rather than watercolour).

Many artists, writers, and people with distinct visions have explored the card deck as a vehicle for certain kinds of expression. Many decks lend themselves especially well to the practice of meditation. Visual images provide a rich focus for contemplation and gentle examination of undertones, overtones, similarities, contrasts, references. Some, like the microscope photographs of water crystals by Masuro Emoto seem devoid of literary references, others, such as Caroline Myss’s Archetype Cards are rich troves of mythical references, symbolism and depth psychology.

Cards of many kinds have been published under the aegis of New Age and Alternative Medicine. Many of them depend heavily on words, often inspirational, and the graphic element is secondary, illustrative. Many of these decks offeraffirmations. For example, Louise Hay’s Wisdom Cards can be accessed on–line. Very popular among affirmation users are the Angel Cards, developed by Kathy Tyler and Joy Drake. There are also two deck of cards published by [Findhorn Press], the Angels of Light cards authored by Diana Cooper, who also created the Atlantis Oracle Cards, and The Dragon Cards developed by Polly Waterfield.

The game Dixit uses a similar deck of surreal, evocative pictures for which players decide interpretations.

The roleplaying game Everway makes heavy use of art cards during character creation and uses a deck similar to OH cards or Tarot during play as a source of random events and for resolution of actions.

Other considerations 
Despite suggestions to the contrary, the most common use of OH cards is for divination. In many bookstores and retail outlets, OH cards are often shelved alongside tarot cards. The chance juxtaposition of images, especially within a pre–set frame or schema produces fascinating combinations that lend themselves to speculation about meaning beyond the immediately obvious or literal. Some people suggest that these are often fine examples of synchronicity. The classical divination deck is tarot, which is used by experts of various persuasions to read another person’s fortune. By contrast, OH cards are intended to encourage people to interpret their own cards and speculate on their meaning without adherence to any particular ideology, and without the intervention of an expert. This process makes possible the exploration of such phenomena as perception differences, projection, transference, stimulation, cognition, intuition, and meaning. Differences and similarities between individuals are highlighted.
The use of random draws, or casts, has a long history related to, among other things, shamanism, occult practices, "primitive" religions, as well as science, where random numbers are often an essential ingredient in statistical analysis. One of the best known uses of this process is the consultation of the I Ching, to which Confucius wrote a commentary. A modern perspective on the I Ching can be found in the foreword that C.G. Jung wrote the introduction to the Wilhelm/Baynes translation. Raman indicates that the creation of The OH Cards was informed by all these sources.

An Art form 
Some see the OH card genre as an art form, related in particular to collage. Formally the use of OH cards as art relates to some of the considerations of expressionism, cubism and performance art.

OH Etiquette 
In OH, we honour each other’s privacy.
I may choose to pass, to not play the cards I have drawn.
I can do this with or without explanation, revealing my cards or not.
In OH, we honour each other.
I will not interrupt you.
In OH, we honour each other's intelligence and imagination.
I do not re-interpret (or interpret) your cards -- even in the secrecy of my own mind.
In OH, we honour each other's integrity.
do not contradict you or argue about your interpretations.
I try to remember that there are no "correct" interpretations of the pictures, no misreading of words.
In OH, we honour each other's individuality.
When I interpret my OH Cards I do not assume that you see what I see, feel what I feel, read what I read.

Notes

References
Bourgeois, Adam; The Power of OH, A Path to Growth, Insight, and Appreciation of Self and Others, Ants & Archetypes Inc., Chicago, Illinois, 2000
France, Honore; & Lawrence, Joan; OH Cards: A Process for Interpersonal Exploration, Volume 8, Number 4, March, 1993, 
Guidance Centre, Guidance & Counselling, The Ontario Institute for Studies in Education, Toronto, Ontario
Kirschke, Waltraud; Erdbeered zittern vor dem Fenster, OH Verlag, Germany 1997
Kirschke, Waltraud, Strawberries Beyond My Window, translated to English by K. Egetmeyer and D. Cummins, OH Verlag, Germany 1998
Kirschke, Waltraud, Les fraises derrière la fenêtre, translated to French by C. Gatineau, OH Verlag, Germany 2008
Lawrence, Joan & Raman, Ely; The Little Book About The OH Cards, Eos Interactive Cards, ©1993, 2005
Lawrence, Joan & Raman, Ely; OH…! ecco, Saga, Habitat, Morena, Persona, translated into Dutch by Koppenhol Uitgeverij, B.V./Hilversum, Netherlands
Wilhelm, Richard translation of The I Ching, or Book of Changes rendered into English by Cary. F. Baynes. Bollingen Series Six, Princeton University Press, ©1950
OH Cards Hong Kong - http://hkioh.com
OH cards Romania - http://www.OH-cards.ro
OH Cards Switzerland - https://oh-karten.ch

External links
OH Cards
OH Cards Institute
OH Cards North America
OH Cards Romania - since 2009
[http://www.facebook.com/distribuitorOHcards/
[https://therapycards.eu  - Authorised Distributor in Romania and Moldova, Republic of
OH Cards Hong Kong
OH Cards Hungary 
OH Cards Switzerland 

Playing cards
Cartomancy